Jon Evans (born April 11, 1973) is a Canadian novelist, journalist, adventure traveler, and software engineer.

Early life
Born to an expatriate Rhodesian father and Canadian mother, Evans grew up in Waterloo, Ontario and graduated from the University of Waterloo. He has a degree in electrical engineering and over 10 years of experience working as a software engineer. He lives in Berkeley, California, with his wife, who is an attorney.

Career
Evans won the 2005 Arthur Ellis Award for Best First Novel from the Crime Writers of Canada for his book Dark Places and has been reviewed in such publications as The Economist and The Washington Post. His graphic novel The Executor was named one of the ten best of 2010 by Comic Book Resources, and his novel Beasts of New York won a 2011 ForeWord Book of the Year Awards medal.

Evans has also written for magazines such as New Scientist, The Times of India, The Walrus, and Wired, and the newspapers The Globe and Mail and The Guardian, and he writes a weekly column for TechCrunch. Now based in San Francisco, California, he frequently travels the world to research the locations of his novels.

Bibliography
Much of Evans' work is released under a Creative Commons license and can be downloaded for free.

Novels
(All can be downloaded at Feedbooks.com)

Exadelic, 2023.

Graphic novels

Travel writing

Journalism

See also
 List of University of Waterloo people

References

External links

Canadian mystery writers
Living people
1973 births
University of Waterloo alumni